Alice Bellandi (born 28 November 1998) is an Italian judoka. In 2021, she competed in the women's 70 kg event at the 2020 Summer Olympics in Tokyo, Japan.

She is the silver medallist of the 2019 Judo Grand Prix Tel Aviv in the -70 kg category. She is openly lesbian.

In 2022, she won the silver medal in her event at the Judo Grand Prix Almada held in Almada, Portugal. She won one of the bronze medals in her event at the 2022 Judo Grand Slam Tel Aviv held in Tel Aviv, Israel.

References

External links
 
 
 

1998 births
Living people
Italian female judoka
Judoka at the 2019 European Games
European Games competitors for Italy
Lesbian sportswomen
Italian LGBT sportspeople
Italian lesbians
LGBT judoka
Judoka at the 2020 Summer Olympics
Olympic judoka of Italy
21st-century Italian LGBT people
21st-century Italian women